The 2012 Ivy League Baseball Championship Series took place at Hoy Field in Ithaca, NY on May 5 and 6.  The series matched the regular season champions of each of the league's two divisions.  , the winner of the series, claimed the Ivy League's automatic berth in the 2012 NCAA Division I baseball tournament.

Cornell won the series, which required all three games, on an 11th inning walk-off home run by Chris Cruz.  It was the Big Red's first Ivy League baseball championship since the league began sponsoring baseball in 1993.  It was also the first baseball championship for Cornell since 1977, when they claimed the EIBL title.

Dartmouth has appeared in the Ivy League Championship Series every year since 2008, winning in 2009 and 2010.

Results
Game One

Game Two

Game Three

References

Ivy League Baseball Championship Series
Tournament